Hans Brunke (1 October 1904 – 6 March 1985) was a German international footballer.

References

1904 births
1985 deaths
Association football defenders
German footballers
Germany international footballers
Tennis Borussia Berlin players